Sandy Camp is a locality in the Toowoomba Region, Queensland, Australia.

Education 
There are no schools in Sandy Camp. The nearest primary schools are in Back Plains and Clifton. The nearest secondary school is in Clifton.

References 

Toowoomba Region
Localities in Queensland